Paciano is a comune (municipality) in the Province of Perugia in the Italian region Umbria, located about 30 km southwest of Perugia. As of 31 December 2004, it had a population of 974 and an area of 16.8 km².

Paciano borders the following municipalities: Castiglione del Lago, Città della Pieve, Panicale, Piegaro.

Demographic evolution

References

External links
 www.comune.paciano.pg.it/
 Article on the Washington Post about olive oil in Paciano

Cities and towns in Umbria